Southern United Football Club was an English football club based in the Nunhead area of London.

History
Established in 1905, the club entered teams into Division Two of the Southern League and Division One of the London League. They withdrew from the Southern League at the end of the 1905–06 season, and from the London League during the 1906–07 season.

Professional players at the club included Frederick Mearns, Michael Good and former England international Fred Spiksley.

Ground
Southern United played at Brown's Ground in Nunhead. Following Southern United folding, the ground was used by Nunhead.

References

Defunct football clubs in England
Association football clubs established in 1905
Defunct football clubs in London
Southern Football League clubs
1905 establishments in England
London League (football)